Simonds Tavern is a historic tavern building in Lexington, Massachusetts.  It is a -story wood-frame structure, eight bays wide, with two front entrances and asymmetrically placed chimneys.  The first portion of the building was built c. 1794 by Joshua Simonds, who also ran a tavern near Fiske Hill.  He began operating a tavern at this site in 1802, and enlarged the building 1810 after Bedford Street was cut through the area.  The building's interior has well-preserved Federal details.

The building was listed on the National Register of Historic Places in 1976.  It is now residences.

See also
National Register of Historic Places listings in Middlesex County, Massachusetts

References

Commercial buildings completed in 1794
Drinking establishments on the National Register of Historic Places in Massachusetts
Houses in Lexington, Massachusetts
Buildings and structures in Lexington, Massachusetts
National Register of Historic Places in Middlesex County, Massachusetts
1794 establishments in Massachusetts